Criopsis curtus is a species of beetle in the family Cerambycidae, the only species in the genus Criopsis.

References

Acanthoderini